"Won't Forget You" is a song by Australian-New Zealand electronic music duo Shouse, released on 4 February 2022, through Australian label Hell Beach, a sub label of Onelove Recordings Australia.

Background and release
"Won't Forget You" was recorded between trips to Europe and a live appearance at the Sydney Opera House on New Years Eve and with a choir of over 50 friends and colleagues.

The duo said, "'Won't Forget You' is a song about friendship and love, on the connections that last forever. We have all endured a period of disconnection, but we never forget the people who are so important to us. This song is for your best friends, for the family that lives far, for the new friend met in the disco. It's the song that reminds us of what we love. It's a song to sing together."

"Won't Forget You" was the basis for Jason DeRulo's collaboration with Shouse.  In December 2022, "Never Let You Go" became a big radio hit in Australia.

Track listings
Digital download
 "Won't Forget You" – 6:38
 "Won't Forget You" (Edit) – 3:50

Charts

Weekly charts

Monthly charts

Year-end charts

Certifications

References

2022 singles
2022 songs
Shouse (duo) songs
Song recordings produced by Shouse (duo)
Songs written by Ed Service
Songs written by Jack Madin